Devergan, also rendered as Daverjan, may refer to:
 Devergan-e Olya
 Devergan-e Sofla